Benjamin Charles Garside (June 26, 1863 - August 9, 1933) was an American machinist from Milwaukee, Wisconsin who served one term as a People's Party member of the Wisconsin State Assembly.

Background 
Garside was born in Glossop, Derbyshire, England, on June 26, 1863. He came to Wisconsin in 1864 and settled at Milwaukee, was educated in the Second Ward public school of Milwaukee, and became a machinist by trade. He lived in South Chicago, Illinois from 1880 to 1883 before returning to Milwaukee.

Elective office 
Garside was on the executive committee of the Milwaukee Knights of Labor, and was one of the labor leaders under indictment for their roles in the labor unrest which ended in the Bay View Massacre, when elected to the Assembly in 1886 from the 8th Milwaukee County Assembly district (the 8th, 11th and 14th Ward of the City of Milwaukee) to succeed Democrat Frank Haderer (who was not a candidate for re-election) for the session of 1887. Garside won 2580 votes on a "High tariff and anti-monopoly" platform, to 1094 for Republican Charles Weilner and 652 votes for Democratic former Assemblyman John Fellenz. He received five votes as the People's Party candidate for Speaker of the Assembly; and was assigned to the standing committee on state affairs.

He ran for re-election in 1888 under the People's Party's new name of "Labor Party", losing to Republican Amos Thomas, who polled 2351 votes, to 1375 votes for former Democratic Assemblyman George Everts and 248 for Garside.

Personal life 
At the time of his service in the Assembly he was married. He died on August 9, 1933, in Chicago, Illinois.

References 

1863 births
1933 deaths
Machinists
Members of the Wisconsin State Assembly
Politicians from Chicago
Politicians from Milwaukee
People from Glossop
Wisconsin Laborites
Trade unionists from Wisconsin
American trade unionists of English descent
English emigrants to the United States
Knights of Labor people